The 2021–22 season was A.C. Perugia Calcio's first season back in second division of the Italian football league, the Serie B, and the 117th as a football club.

Players

First-team quad

Out on loan

Pre-season and friendlies

Competitions

Overall record

Serie A

League table

Results summary

Results by round

Matches
The league fixtures were announced on 24 July 2021.

Coppa Italia

References

A.C. Perugia Calcio seasons
Perugia